Marin Belușica (7 October 1928 – 2013) was a Romanian wrestler. He competed in the men's Greco-Roman welterweight at the 1952 Summer Olympics.

References

External links
 

1928 births
2013 deaths
Romanian male sport wrestlers
Olympic wrestlers of Romania
Wrestlers at the 1952 Summer Olympics
Sportspeople from Ploiești